Elias of Jerusalem (or Elijah, Eliya, etc.) may refer to:

Elias I of Jerusalem, patriarch (494–516)
Elias II of Jerusalem, Greek Orthodox patriarch (770–797)
Elias III of Jerusalem, Greek Orthodox patriarch (879–907)
Eliya ibn ʿUbaid, Nestorian bishop (878/9–893)